In enzymology, a 1-alkenylglycerophosphoethanolamine O-acyltransferase is an enzyme that catalyzes the chemical reaction

acyl-CoA + 1-alkenylglycerophosphoethanolamine  CoA + 1-alkenyl-2-acylglycerophosphoethanolamine

Thus, the two substrates of this enzyme are acyl-CoA and 1-alkenylglycerophosphoethanolamine, whereas its two products are CoA and 1-alkenyl-2-acylglycerophosphoethanolamine.

This enzyme belongs to the family of transferases, specifically those acyltransferases transferring groups other than aminoacyl groups.  The systematic name of this enzyme class is acyl-CoA:1-alkenylglycerophosphoethanolamine O-acyltransferase. This enzyme participates in ether lipid metabolism.

References

 

EC 2.3.1
Enzymes of unknown structure